Türkmengala District   is a district of Mary Province in Turkmenistan. The administrative center of the district is the town of Türkmengala.

Districts of Turkmenistan
Mary Region